Nudes with Beach Ball is a 1994 pop art painting by Roy Lichtenstein.

See also
 1994 in art

References

External links
 Lichtenstein Foundation website

1994 paintings
20th-century portraits
Nude art
Paintings by Roy Lichtenstein
Portraits by American artists